A Little Monk is a 2003 South Korean film helmed by first-time director Joo Kyung-jung. It was chosen as one of the "10 Best Korean Films" in 2003 by the Korean Association of Film Critics Awards.

Plot
Three monks live in a quiet, secluded mountain temple. The little monk is unhappy living in the temple and longs for his mother to return for him; the teenage monk who cannot forget a pretty girl he once met and decides to leave the temple; and the old monk who takes care of them.

Cast
 Kim Tae-jin as little monk  
 Kim Ye-ryeong as widow
 Kim Min-kyo as Jeong-shim
 O Yeong-su as temple master 
 Jeon Moo-song as woodcutter

Awards and nominations

References

External links 
 
 
 

2003 films
2000s Korean-language films
South Korean drama films
2000s South Korean films